Kappa Delta (also known as KD or Kaydee) was the first sorority founded at the State Female Normal School (now Longwood University), in Farmville, Virginia.

Kappa Delta is one of the "Farmville Four" sororities founded at the university, which includes  Alpha Sigma Alpha, Sigma Sigma Sigma, and Zeta Tau Alpha. A clock tower at the university campus with a clock face representing each sorority is dedicated to the four. Each sorority in the "Farmville Four" is also a member of the National Panhellenic Conference, which governs the 26 national social sororities.

Kappa Delta has over 274,000 initiated members and 167 active collegiate chapters. Kappa Delta also has more than 200 chartered alumnae chapters. It is headquartered in Memphis, Tennessee.

History
Kappa Delta was founded by four college students at the State Female Normal School (now Longwood University), in Farmville, Virginia. The Founders were:
 Lenora Ashmore Blackiston
 Mary Sommerville Sparks Hendrick
 Julia Tyler Gardiner Wilson
 Sara Turner White 

Blackiston first suggested forming a sorority. She went on to attend Randolph-Macon Woman's College. At 23 years of age in 1897, Hendrick was the oldest founder and stayed at State Normal until 1902, longer than any of the other founders. Wilson was the chief illustrator of the school's yearbook and designed the Kappa Delta badge.  White would frequently host Founders Day festivities at her home later in life.

Philanthropies
Kappa Delta Sorority's official philanthropies are the Girls Scouts of the USA and Prevent Child Abuse America.

Kappa Delta's historical philanthropies are the Children's Hospital of Richmond at VCU and Orthopedic Research Awards.

Collegiate and alumnae chapters host confidence-building programs, educational events, campus tours and other activities with Girl Scouts in their communities. Sorority members serve as mentors and volunteers.

Sorority members host Shamrock events every year to raise money for Prevent Child Abuse America and local child abuse prevention efforts. To date, Kappa Delta has donated more than $23 million to prevent child abuse in the U.S.

Symbols
The official symbols of ΚΔ are the nautilus shell and the dagger, while the mascots are the teddy bear and the katydid. The official colors are olive green and pearl white. The official flower is the white rose. ΚΔ has three official jewels: the diamond, the emerald, and the pearl.

Kappa Delta's coat of arms (often called the crest) is a white Norman shield, surmounted by a lamp of ancient design, against a background of ornamental scroll. A ribbon underneath the shield bears the date of the sorority's founding. Kappa Delta's tagline is "Building Confidence. Inspiring Action."

Membership

National leadership
 President- Susan Stockton
 Vice President- Emily Ulmer Feinstein
 VP Membership- Courtney Hicks Dickey
 VP Collegians- Laura Beth Hanson McKew
 VP Alumnae- Tove Bichel Thomas
 VP Finance- Sarah Smith Dubbert
 NPC Delegate- Julie Landgren Johnson
 Executive Director - Maggie Waples

Chapters

Kappa Delta has 166 collegiate chapters across North America.

Local chapter or member misconduct
In 2022, Betty Jane Cadle, former treasurer of the sorority chapter at Mississippi State University, was convicted of stealing $2.9 million from the sorority.  As a result of Cadle's wrongdoing, the sorority chapter struggled financially.  According to court documents, Cadle began to intentionally divert funds from the sorority’s bank accounts in 2012. She used handwritten checks to transfer large sums of money into her personal bank account and into the account of Belles and Beaus, a downtown Oxford children’s clothing store owned by Cadle and her daughter, Cathy Lowe. Prosecutors say the fraud continued until late 2019.  Cadle will serve four years in prison and was ordered to pay $2.9 million in restitution back to the sorority chapter.

In 2013 and 2014, sorority women from multiple sorority chapters at the University of Alabama – including Kappa Delta, Alpha Gamma Delta, Alpha Omicron Pi, Phi Mu, Alpha Chi Omega, Pi Beta Phi, Delta Delta Delta, Kappa Kappa Gamma, and Chi Omega – alleged that either active members or some alumnae had prevented them from offering membership to black candidates because of their race.  Students, including Kappa Delta members, held a campus march to integrate Greek life on campus, and following media and national outcry, the university held a second round of recruitment in hopes of offering membership to more women.

Notable members

See also
 Fraternities and sororities in North America
 List of Kappa Delta chapters
 List of social fraternities and sororities

References

External links
Kappa Delta Website

 
Student organizations established in 1897
National Panhellenic Conference
Student societies in the United States
1897 establishments in Virginia
Longwood University
Organizations based in Memphis, Tennessee
Burials at the University of Virginia Cemetery